Semaine Olympique Française La Rochelle (lit. La Rochelle French Olympic Week) is an annual sailing regatta. It has been organised since 2013 in La Rochelle.

The Semaine Olympique Française in La Rochelle was born when the Semaine Olympique Française in Hyères received ISAF Sailing World Cup status.

It is part of the 2015 EUROSAF Champions Sailing Cup.

Winners

Men's 470

2013 –  Pierre Leboucher & Nicholas le Berre

Men's 49er

2013 –  Emmanuel Dyen & Stéphane Christidis
2015 –  James Peters & Fynn Sterritt

Men's Finn

2013 –  Giles Scott
2015 –  Max Salminen

Men's Laser

2013 –  Rutger van Schaardenburg
2015 –  Jean-Baptiste Bernaz

Men's RS:X

2013 –  Piotr Myszka
2015 –  Trevor Caraes

Women's 470

2013 –  Lara Vadlau & Jolanta Ogar

Women's 49er FX

2013 –  Sarah Steyaert & Julie Bossard
2015 –  Sarah Steyaert & Aude Compan

Women's Laser Radial

2013 –  Marie Barrue
2015 –  Anne-Marie Rindom

Women's RS:X

2013 –  Zofia Klepacka
2015 –  Farrah Hall

Mixed Nacra 17

2013 –  Franck Cammas & Sophie de Turckheim
2015 –  Billy Besson & Marie Riou

Longtze

2015 –  Laurent Berjon, Samy Villeneuve, David Boudgourd & Jean-Baptiste Morin

References

Annual sporting events in France
Sailing competitions in France
Sailing regattas
Sport in La Rochelle
EUROSAF Champions Sailing Cup
Sailing World Cup